Ravenstone Priory was a medieval monastic house in Buckinghamshire, England. It was established c.1255 and was dissolved in 1524.

History
Ravenstone Priory was founded c.1255 on land owned by Peter Chaceporc, archdeacon of Wells and Keeper of the Royal Wardrobe. It was established as a house for canons following the Rule of St Augustine and dedicated to St Mary.  There are no known records of the number of canons at the priory at its foundation, and very little is known about the priory's history or architecture. The canons at the priory received 20 shillings each as an annual income.

The priory was dissolved on 17 February 1524, probably due to a decreased number of canons, as there were only two remaining at this point. The priory was dissolved by Thomas Wolsey, who used the resulting funds to establish a college at Oxford University (now Christ Church College). It later came under the ownership of Francis Bryan and, after him, Robert Throgmorton.

A farmhouse was later built on the site of the priory, and known as the Abbey. The remains of the priory, moats and fishponds have been listed as a Scheduled Ancient Monument by English Heritage.

References

Monasteries in Buckinghamshire
1255 establishments in England
Christian monasteries established in the 13th century
1524 disestablishments
Scheduled monuments in Buckinghamshire